is a railway station planned to be constructed on the Hokkaido Shinkansen in the town of Yakumo, Hokkaido, Japan. Scheduled to open in 2031, it will be operated by Hokkaido Railway Company (JR Hokkaido).

Lines
It will be located 3 km west of Yakumo Station.

See also
 List of railway stations in Japan

References

Railway stations in Hokkaido Prefecture
Stations of Hokkaido Railway Company
Hokkaido Shinkansen
Yakumo, Hokkaido